Reveludden Nature Reserve is a nature reserve in Stockholm County in Sweden.

The nature reserve covers a sandy peninsula in the Baltic Sea with beach meadows and a shallow coastline. It is an important habitat for migratory birds who rest here between July and September. The coastal meadows also provide a habitat for several unusual plants, including Gentianella uliginosa, sea thrift, Centaurium littorale, sea plantain and sea kale among others.

References

Nature reserves in Sweden
Geography of Stockholm County
Tourist attractions in Stockholm County
Protected areas established in 1966
1966 establishments in Sweden